Alfred Yvon Louchet (6 June 1902 – 26 January 1944) was a French racing cyclist. He rode in the 1926 Tour de France. He died in the Mauthausen concentration camp during World War II.

References

External links
 

1902 births
1944 deaths
French male cyclists
Place of birth missing
Sportspeople from Seine-Maritime
French people who died in Mauthausen concentration camp
French civilians killed in World War II
Cyclists from Normandy